"One Hot Pleasure" is a song recorded by American singer and songwriter Erika Jayne. It reached number one on Billboards Hot Dance Club Play chart in 2011. "One Hot Pleasure" became Jayne's fifth number one single on the Hot Dance Club Play chart.

Critical reception 
In 2016, Conor Behan of PopCrush wrote that "if Britney and Kylie teamed up for a David Guetta track circa 2011, it would probably have sounded like this." Behan described the song as a "saucy floor-filler that would still sound fresh if some big name pop titan released the same track today."

Background and composition 
"One Hot Pleasure" was written by Dave Audé, Luciana Caporaso, and Nick Clow, while Jayne and Audé handled its production. It was the first song released from Jayne's own record label, Pretty Mess Records, which she established in 2010.

Music video 
The official music video for "One Hot Pleasure" was directed by Jayne's longtime collaborator and choreographer Mikey Minden.

Track listings and formats 

CD maxi single
 "One Hot Pleasure" (Original Radio Edit) – 
 "One Hot Pleasure" (Video Version) – 
 "One Hot Pleasure" (Extended Version) – 
 "One Hot Pleasure" (Dave Audé Remix) – 
 "One Hot Pleasure" (Ralphi Rosario Club Mix) – 
 "One Hot Pleasure" (Sultan & Ned Shepard One Hot Remix) – 
 "One Hot Pleasure" (Dirtyloud Vocal Mix) – 
 "One Hot Pleasure" (DJ Mr. White Remix) – 
CD single "The Club Mixes"
 "One Hot Pleasure" (Video Version) – 
 "One Hot Pleasure" (Extended Version) – 
 "One Hot Pleasure" (Dave Audé Remix) – 
 "One Hot Pleasure" (Sultan & Ned Shepard One Hot Remix) – 
 "One Hot Pleasure" (Ralphi Rosario Club Mix) – 
 "One Hot Pleasure" (Dirtyloud Vocal Mix) – 
 "One Hot Pleasure" (DJ Mr. White Remix) – 

CD single "The Dub Mixes"
 "One Hot Pleasure" (Dave Audé Club Dub) – 
 "One Hot Pleasure" (Sultan & Ned Shepard One Hot Dub Mix) – 
 "One Hot Pleasure" (Dirtyloud Dub Mix) – 
 "One Hot Pleasure" (Ralphi Rosario's One Hot Dub) – 
CD single "The Radio Mixes"
 "One Hot Pleasure" (Original Radio Edit) – 
 "One Hot Pleasure" (Dave Audé Radio) – 
 "One Hot Pleasure" (Ralphi Rosario Edit) – 
 "One Hot Pleasure" (Sultan & Ned Shepard One Hot Remix) – 
 "One Hot Pleasure" (Dirtyloud Vocal Mix) – 
 "One Hot Pleasure" (DJ Mr. White Remix) – 
DVD single "The Video"
 "One Hot Pleasure" (The Video) –

Charts

Release history

See also 
List of number-one dance singles of 2011 (US)

References 

2010 singles
2007 songs
Songs written by Nick Clow
Songs written by Dave Audé
Songs written by Luciana Caporaso